Dissimulation is the debut studio album by Hope for the Dying. Facedown Records released the album on April 26, 2011.

Critical reception

Awarding the album four and a half stars from HM Magazine, Rob Shameless states, "It is clean. It is heavy. It is good metal." Graeme Crawford, rating the album a nine out of ten at Cross Rhythms, describes, "Dark, brooding and highly intense, the second album from Jonesboro, Illinois' Hope For The Dying is a stunning work of progressive, technical metal. Elements of thrash, death, black and '80s heavy metal are combined with classical sections and a progressive mentality to deliver an intricate, thought provoking yet very heavy album." Giving the album four and a half stars for Jesus Freak Hideout, Michael Weaver writes, "Dissimulation is one of the best metal albums to come around in a while." Wayne Reimer, awarding the album four stars by Jesus Freak Hideout, says, "There's a whole lot happening in Dissimulation, but they pull off everything they attempt."

Track listing

Personnel 

Hope for the Dying
 Josh Ditto – vocals, keyboards
 James Houseman – guitar, backing vocals
 Jack Daniels – guitar
 Brendan Hengle – drums, bass

References

2011 debut albums
Hope for the Dying albums
Facedown Records albums